The Coleen River is a  tributary of the Porcupine River in the northeastern part of the U.S. state of Alaska. It begins in the Davidson Mountains in the Arctic National Wildlife Refuge and flows generally south-southeast into the larger river east of Coleen Mountain. Its name comes from the French coline, which means hill.

See also
List of rivers of Alaska

References

External links

Rivers of North Slope Borough, Alaska
Rivers of Alaska
Rivers of Yukon–Koyukuk Census Area, Alaska
Tributaries of the Yukon River
Rivers of Unorganized Borough, Alaska